Ole Jensen Rong (26 November 1885 – 18 July 1953) was a Norwegian politician for the Labour Party.

He was born in Herlø.

He was elected to the Norwegian Parliament from Hordaland in 1945, and was re-elected on one occasion. He had previously served in the position of deputy representative during the terms 1934–1936 and 1937–1945. Towards the end of his second term in Parliament, he died and was replaced by Knut Severin Jakobsen Vik.

Rong held various positions in Herdla municipality council from 1928 to 1947, except for the years 1940–1945, during World War II.

References

1885 births
1953 deaths
Labour Party (Norway) politicians
Members of the Storting
20th-century Norwegian politicians